The 2003 floor crossing window period in South Africa was a period of 15 days, from 21 March to 4 April 2003, in which members of the National Assembly and the provincial legislatures were able to cross the floor from one political party to another without giving up their seats. The period was authorised by the passage of the Tenth Amendment of the Constitution of South Africa. The amendment scheduled regular window periods in the second and fourth September after each election, but the second and fourth Septembers after the 1999 election had already passed, so it included provision for a special window period starting fifteen days after the amendment came into effect.

In the National Assembly, the floor-crossing expanded the African National Congress' (ANC) representation from 266 seats, one short of the two-thirds majority needed to amend the constitution, to 275 seats. In the KwaZulu-Natal Provincial Legislature, the Inkatha Freedom Party (IFP) and the ANC were before the window period the largest and second-largest parties respectively. As a result of the floor-crossing, they changed places; however, the ANC did not attain an absolute majority, holding 35 seats of 80. In the Western Cape Provincial Parliament the ANC expanded its representation to an absolute majority, growing from 18 to 22 seats of a total 42.

During this window period representatives of the Democratic Party (DP) officially became representatives of the Democratic Alliance (DA). Amongst a group of new parties created by floor-crossing, the most significant was the Independent Democrats, who gained one member in the National Assembly and one in the Gauteng Provincial Legislature.

The tables below show all the changes; in those provinces not listed there was no change in the provincial legislature, other than the DP becoming the DA.

Tables

National Assembly

|-style="background:#e9e9e9;"
!colspan="2" style="text-align:left"|Party
!Seats before
!Net change
!Seats after
|-
|
|266
| +9
|275
|-
|
|38
| +8
|46
|-
|
|34
| −3
|31
|-
|
|28
| −8
|20
|-
|
|6
| +1
|7
|-
|
|14
| −10
|4
|-
|
|3
| 0
|3
|-
|
|3
| 0
|3
|-
|
|3
| −1
|2
|-
|bgcolor="#eeeeee"|
|style="text-align:left"|Federal Alliance
|2
| 0
|2
|-
|
|1
| 0
|1
|-
|
|1
| 0
|1
|-
|bgcolor="#eeeeee"|
|style="text-align:left"|African Independent Movement
|
| +1
|1
|-
|bgcolor="#eeeeee"|
|style="text-align:left"|Alliance for Democracy and Prosperity
|
| +1
|1
|-
|
|
| +1
|1
|-
|bgcolor="#eeeeee"|
|style="text-align:left"|National Action
|
| +1
|1
|-
|bgcolor="#eeeeee"|
|style="text-align:left"|Peace and Justice Congress
|
| +1
|1
|-
|bgcolor="#eeeeee"|
|style="text-align:left"|Afrikaner Eenheidsbeweging
|1
| −1
|0
|-style="background:#e9e9e9;"
!colspan="2" style="text-align:left"|Total
!colspan="3" style="text-align:center"|400
|}

Eastern Cape Provincial Legislature

|-style="background:#e9e9e9;"
!colspan="2" style="text-align:left"|Party
!Seats before
!Net change
!Seats after
|-
|
|47
| +2
|49
|-
|
|9
| −2
|7
|-
|
|4
| +1
|5
|-
|
|2
| −1
|1
|-
|
|1
| 0
|1
|-style="background:#e9e9e9;"
!colspan="2" style="text-align:left"|Total
!colspan="3" style="text-align:center"|63
|}

Gauteng Provincial Legislature

|-style="background:#e9e9e9;"
!colspan="2" style="text-align:left"|Party
!Seats before
!Net change
!Seats after
|-
|
|50
| 0
|50
|-
|
|13
| −1
|12
|-
|
|3
| 0
|3
|-
|
|3
| 0
|3
|-
|
|1
| 0
|1
|-
|bgcolor="#eeeeee"|
|style="text-align:left"|Federal Alliance
|1
| 0
|1
|-
|
|1
| 0
|1
|-
|
|
| +1
|1
|-
|
|
| +1
|1
|-
|
|1
| −1
|0
|-style="background:#e9e9e9;"
!colspan="2" style="text-align:left"|Total
!colspan="3" style="text-align:center"|73
|}

KwaZulu-Natal Provincial Legislature

|-style="background:#e9e9e9;"
!colspan="2" style="text-align:left"|Party
!Seats before
!Net change
!Seats after
|-
|
|32
| +3
|35
|-
|
|34
| −2
|32
|-
|
|7
| −1
|6
|-
|
|3
| −1
|2
|-
|
|2
| 0
|2
|-
|
|1
| 0
|1
|-
|
|1
| 0
|1
|-
|bgcolor="#eeeeee"|
|style="text-align:left"|Peace and Development Party
|
| +1
|1
|-style="background:#e9e9e9;"
!colspan="2" style="text-align:left"|Total
!colspan="3" style="text-align:center"|80
|}

Western Cape Provincial Parliament

|-style="background:#e9e9e9;"
!colspan="2" style="text-align:left"|Party
!Seats before
!Net change
!Seats after
|-
|
|18
| +4
|22
|-
|
|17
| −7
|10
|-
|
|5
| +2
|7
|-
|
|1
| +1
|2
|-
|bgcolor="#eeeeee"|
|style="text-align:left"|New Labour Party
|
| +1
|1
|-
|
|1
| −1
|0
|-style="background:#e9e9e9;"
!colspan="2" style="text-align:left"|Total
!colspan="3" style="text-align:center"|42
|}

National Council of Provinces
The National Council of Provinces was reconstituted as a result of the changes in the provincial legislatures. Its reconstituted makeup was as follows:

|-style="background:#e9e9e9;"
!colspan="2" style="text-align:left"|Party
!style="text-align:left"|Delegate type
!EC
!FS
!G
!KZN
!M
!NW
!NC
!NP
!WC
!colspan=2|Total
|-
| style="width: 4px" bgcolor= rowspan=2|
| style="text-align: left;" scope="row" rowspan=2 | 
|style="text-align:left"|Permanent
|4
|4
|4
|3
|5
|4
|4
|5
|3
|36
|rowspan=2|66
|-
|style="text-align:left"|Special
|4
|4
|3
|2
|4
|4
|3
|4
|2
|30
|-
| style="width: 4px" bgcolor= rowspan=2|
| style="text-align: left;" scope="row" rowspan=2 | 
|style="text-align:left"|Permanent
|1
|1
|1
|1
|1
|1
|
|
|1
|7
|rowspan=2|9
|-
|style="text-align:left"|Special
|
|
|1
|
|
|
|
|
|1
|2
|-
| style="width: 4px" bgcolor= rowspan=2|
| style="text-align: left;" scope="row" rowspan=2 | 
|style="text-align:left"|Permanent
|
|1
|1
|
|
|
|2
|
|1
|5
|rowspan=2|7
|-
|style="text-align:left"|Special
|
|
|
|
|
|
|1
|
|1
|2
|-
| style="width: 4px" bgcolor= rowspan=2|
| style="text-align: left;" scope="row" rowspan=2 | 
|style="text-align:left"|Permanent
|
|
|
|2
|
|
|
|
|
|2
|rowspan=2|4
|-
|style="text-align:left"|Special
|
|
|
|2
|
|
|
|
|
|2
|-
|
|style="text-align:left"|Permanent
|1
|
|
|
|
|
|
|1
|
|colspan=2|2
|-
|
|style="text-align:left"|Permanent
|
|
|
|
|
|
|
|
|1
|colspan=2|1
|-
|
|style="text-align:left"|Permanent
|
|
|
|
|
|1
|
|
|
|colspan=2|1
|-style="background:#e9e9e9;"
!colspan="3" style="text-align:left"|Total
!10
!10
!10
!10
!10
!10
!10
!10
!10
!colspan=2|90
|}

Notes to the tables

See also
 Floor crossing (South Africa)
 2005 South African floor-crossing window period
 2007 South African floor-crossing window period

References

Floor-crossing window period
Political history of South Africa